The Nickelodeon UK Kids' Choice Awards was first announced in May 2007. It is the first ever Kids' Choice Awards for the UK Nickelodeon. The show was hosted at ExCeL Exhibition Centre, London which took place 20 October 2007 and was presented by pop band McFly.

The Nickelodeon UK Kids' Choice Awards is very similar to the Australian and American versions, kids get to vote by clicking on the Nickelodeon website. Whoever voted on the website had a chance to get tickets to attend the ceremony in London. Also, another competition was held about "Nickelodeon's Big Green Thing"; people who went online and did what the commercial told them to do could also win a family ticket for 4 to the ceremony.

Guests
 Josh Peck
 John Cena
 David Walliams
 Brian Belo
 Chanelle Hayes
 Ziggy Lichman
 Matt Willis
 Amanda Marchant
 Samantha Marchant
 Devon Werkheiser

Nominees

Best TV Actress
 Ashley Tisdale - Winner 
 Emma Roberts 
 Jamie Lynn Spears 
 Miley Cyrus

Best Female Singer
 Avril Lavigne
 Cheryl Cole
 Hilary Duff - Winner 
 Gwen Stefani

Best Reality Show
 The X Factor - Winner 
 Big Brother 
 Britain’s Got Talent
 I'm a Celebrity... Get Me Out of Here!

Best Book
 Harry Potter and the Deathly Hallows – J. K. Rowling - Winner 
 Care and the Feeding of Sprites (Spiderwick Chronicles) – Holly Black
 Blood Beast (The Demonata) – Darren Shan
 Jacky Daydream – Jacqueline Wilson

Best Movie Actress
 Cameron Diaz
 Dakota Fanning
 Emma Watson - Winner 
 Keira Knightley

Funniest Person
 Jack Black - Winner 
 Rowan Atkinson
 Catherine Tate
 Harry Hill

Best Sportsperson
 David Beckham
 John Cena - Winner 
 Kelly Holmes
 Lewis Hamilton
(Even though after they announced Beckham as the winner, John Cena would not accept it and McFly awarded him the 'Most Injured Wrestler' award).

Best Movie Actor
 Johnny Depp - (Pirates of the Caribbean: At World's End) - Winner 
 Daniel Radcliffe - (Harry Potter & the Order of the Phoenix)
 Orlando Bloom - (Pirates of the Caribbean: At World's End)
 Rowan Atkinson - (Mr. Bean's Holiday)

Best Male Singer
 Drake Bell - Winner 
 Danny Jones
 Justin Timberlake
 Mika

Best TV Actor
 David Tennant
 Drake Bell  
 Nat Wolff  - Winner 
 Zac Efron

Best TV Presenter
 Davina McCall
 Fearne Cotton
 Ugly Mark
 Ant and Dec - Winner

Best TV Show
 Doctor Who
 Drake & Josh - Winner 
 H2O: Just Add Water
 Hannah Montana

Best Cartoon
 Fairly Odd Parents
 Recess
 The Simpsons
 SpongeBob SquarePants - Winner

Best Band
 Fall Out Boy
 Girls Aloud
 McFly - Winner (Hosts) 
 Sugababes

MTV Hits Best Music Video
 "Cupid's Chokehold" by Gym Class Heroes
 "Girlfriend" by Avril Lavigne - Winner 
 "Grace Kelly" by Mika
 "Listen" by Beyoncé
 "Ruby" by Kaiser Chiefs
 "Same Jeans" by The View
 "The Sweet Escape" by Gwen Stefani featuring Akon
 "Too Little Too Late" by Jojo
 "Umbrella" by Rihanna
 "What Goes Around... Comes Around" by Justin Timberlake

Best Video Game
 The Sims 2 - Winner 
 FIFA 07
 Mario Strikers Charged Football
 Wii Sports

Best Movie of the Year
 Harry Potter and the Order of the Phoenix
 Pirates of the Caribbean: At World's End
 Shrek the Third
 The Simpsons Movie - Winner

References

Nickelodeon Kids' Choice Awards
2007 awards
2007 in the United Kingdom